

The New Japan Cup (NJC) is an annual single-elimination professional wrestling tournament held by New Japan Pro-Wrestling (NJPW) since 2005. It is considered the second most prominent heavyweight tournament in NJPW, after the G1 Climax which follows a round-robin format.

Since the 2006 edition, the winner of the tournament, like with the G1 Climax, would receive a championship match, originally, for the IWGP Heavyweight Championship. However, unlike with the G1 Climax, the reigning IWGP Heavyweight Champion could not participate in the tournament (in the case of the champion winning the G1 Climax, he would get to pick the next challenger for his title). In 2014–2018, the winner could choose to challenge for the IWGP Intercontinental Championship instead, while in 2015–2018, the NEVER Openweight Championship was also an option; only the 2014 winner Shinsuke Nakamura chose not to compete for the Heavyweight Championship, challenging for the Intercontinental Championship instead. In 2020, due to Tetsuya Naito being both the Heavyweight and Intercontinental Champion, the winner received a match for both titles, and in 2021, after the Heavyweight and Intercontinental Championships were unified into a new championship, the IWGP World Heavyweight Championship, the latter became the title the winner of the New Japan Cup would automatically challenge for; like previously with the Heavyweight title, the World Heavyweight Champion cannot compete. However, in 2022, it was once again an openweight tournament and featured all the champions from both the heavyweight and junior heavyweight divisions including the IWGP World Heavyweight Champion. The first night of the 2022 tournament saw the IWGP World Heavyweight Champion take on the IWGP Junior Heavyweight Champion in the first round, a match that usually happens at NJPW's anniversary event.

The number of participants in the New Japan Cup has varied over the years, from a lowest of 12 in 2007 to a highest of 48 in 2022; the 2021 tournament features 30 entrants. It is considered a heavyweight tournament, although the 2005, 2008–09, 2020, and 2022 editions were openweight tournaments instead, also featuring junior heavyweights; in 2020, NJPW premiered the New Japan Cup USA, a version of the tournament taking place in the United States to determine a contender for the IWGP United States Heavyweight Championship.

Hiroshi Tanahashi is both the inaugural winner of the New Japan Cup, and the first wrestler to have won it twice; Hirooki Goto, Yuji Nagata, Kazuchika Okada, and Zack Sabre Jr. have since also become two-time winners. Goto is both the only three-time winner and the only person to have won the tournament two years in a row.

Tournament Finals

Tournaments

Results

2005

The 2005 New Japan Cup was held from April 19 to April 24. The first two rounds were held on individual nights, with round one taking up the entire card on April 19.

† Minoru was forced to pull out before his Round 2 match, due to suffering severe dizziness, and was replaced by Osamu Nishimura, who he beat in Round 1.

2006

The 2006 New Japan Cup was held from April 16 to April 30. Giant Bernard, the winner of the tournament, went on to fail in his challenge against IWGP Champion Brock Lesnar on May 3.

2007

The 2007 New Japan Cup was a 14-man tournament held from March 3 to March 21. Giant Bernard and Hiroyoshi Tenzan received byes to the second round, due to their victories in the 2006 New Japan Cup and G1 Climax respectively. Shinsuke Nakamura was injured in a non-tournament match on March 13, giving Tenzan an additional pass to the semifinals. The winner, Yuji Nagata, went on to defeat Hiroshi Tanahashi for the championship on April 13, beginning his second reign with the title. He also became the first person to reach the NJC final twice, and the first to win both the New Japan Cup and G1 Climax.

2008

The 2008 New Japan Cup was a 16-man tournament held from March 9 to March 23. The winner, Hiroshi Tanahashi, became the first two-time winner of the NJC and went on to fail in his challenge against IWGP Champion Shinsuke Nakamura on March 30.

1This match originally ended in a double countout at 2:35, but it was restarted with Makabe winning via pinfall in 14:49.

2009

The 2009 New Japan Cup was a 14-man tournament held from March 8 to March 22. Giant Bernard and Yuji Nagata, the winners of the Cups of 2006 and 2007, received byes in the first round of the tournament. The eventual winner of the tournament, Hirooki Goto, went on to lose the IWGP Heavyweight Championship match to Hiroshi Tanahashi on May 3 at Wrestling Dontaku 2009.

1This match originally ended in a double countout at 3:18, but it was restarted with Ishii winning via countout in 9:15.

2010

The 2010 New Japan Cup was a 15-man tournament held from March 14 to March 22. As the previous winner of the Cup, Hirooki Goto received a bye in the first round of the tournament. With his victory, Goto became the second two-time winner of the tournament and the first to win it back-to-back. Goto went on to challenge the IWGP Heavyweight Champion Shinsuke Nakamura on April 4, but would once again fail in his attempt to win the title.

2011

The 2011 New Japan Cup was a 16-man tournament held from March 6 to March 20. The winner, Yuji Nagata, went on to unsuccessfully challenge Hiroshi Tanahashi for the IWGP Heavyweight Championship on April 3.

2012

The 2012 New Japan Cup was a 16-man tournament held from April 1 to April 8. With his win, Hirooki Goto, became the first three-time winner of the tournament.

2013

The 2013 New Japan Cup was a 16-man tournament held from March 11 to March 23. The winner of the tournament, Kazuchika Okada, went on to defeat Hiroshi Tanahashi for the IWGP Heavyweight Championship at Invasion Attack on April 7.

2014

The 2014 New Japan Cup took place between March 15 and 23. The winner of the tournament got to choose whether to challenge for the IWGP Heavyweight or the IWGP Intercontinental Championship.

2015

The 2015 New Japan Cup took place between March 5 and 15. The winner of the tournament got to choose whether to challenge for the IWGP Heavyweight, IWGP Intercontinental or the NEVER Openweight Championship at Invasion Attack 2015 on April 5.

2016

The 2016 New Japan Cup took place between March 3 and 12. The winner of the tournament would once again get to choose whether to challenge for the IWGP Heavyweight, IWGP Intercontinental or NEVER Openweight Championship at Invasion Attack 2016 on April 10.

2017

The 2017 New Japan Cup took place between March 11 and 20. Unlike previous years, this tournament was held across eight events in 10 days. Tomoaki Honma was originally announced for the tournament, but was pulled out and replaced with Yuji Nagata after suffering a spinal cord injury.

2018

The 2018 New Japan Cup took place between March 9 and 21. The winner of the tournament, Zack Sabre Jr., challenged Kazuchika Okada for the IWGP Heavyweight Championship. Sabre also became the second non-Japanese wrestler, after Giant Bernard, to win the New Japan Cup.

2019

The 2019 New Japan Cup took place between March 8 and 24. Unlike the previous year, the tournament featured 32 wrestlers instead of 16 and marks the New Japan Cup debut of 7 wrestlers. After David Finlay was pulled out of the tournament due to an injury, Ryusuke Taguchi was announced as his replacement.

2020

The 2020 New Japan Cup took place between June 16 and July 11. It was originally going to take place from March 4 until March 21, but was postponed when New Japan Pro-Wrestling suspended all of its activities due to the COVID-19 pandemic.

On June 9, New Japan Pro-Wrestling announced that it would resume its activities, beginning with the 2020 edition of the New Japan Cup, which would now be an Openweight tournament and take place from June 16 until July 11, with the final being held at Osaka-jō Hall in Osaka.

Due to both the Heavyweight and Intercontinental titles being held by Tetsuya Naito, the winner of the tournament would earn a match against him for both titles at Dominion in Osaka-jo Hall, instead of choosing one title to challenge for.

Original card
The original card for the New Japan Cup, when it was scheduled to take place from March 4 to March 21, had to be completely re-worked for the eventual final card, as several wrestlers who originally planned to participate could not go to Japan when NJPW resumed its activities due to travel restrictions amid the pandemic.

Of the 32 wrestlers included in the original card, 14 were not a part of the eventual tournament in June–July: Alex Coughlin, Bad Luck Fale, Chase Owens, Colt Cabana, David Finlay, Karl Fredericks, Jay White, Kenta, Jeff Cobb, Juice Robinson, Mikey Nicholls, Tanga Loa, Toa Henare, and Will Ospreay.

 Cancelled Round 1 card

2021 

The 2021 edition's schedule was announced on January 13. The tournament ran from March 4, on NJPW's anniversary event, to March 21. The final night was NJPW's first show held at Xebio Arena Sendai. Evil and Hiroshi Tanahashi received byes on account of being the previous edition's winner and the reigning NEVER Openweight Champion respectively.

At the semifinals on March 20, the match between Kazuchika Okada, Hiroshi Tanahashi and Kota Ibushi and Bullet Club's Jay White, Kenta and Yujiro Takahashi was stopped due to a 7.0 magnitude earthquake that occurred in the Miyagi prefecture. While Bullet Club went backstage; Okada, Tanahashi, and Ibushi stayed in the ring area to calm the crowd and pose for pictures while New Japan employees were performing safety checks throughout the arena, which took about half an hour. After the safety checks were made, the match was able to continue with ring announcer Makoto Abe informing attendees shortly beforehand the rest of the event would be canceled if they were any additional aftershocks.

2022

The 2022 edition's schedule was announced on December 28, 2021, and the tournament ran from March 2 until March 27. The 2022 edition featured 48 participants which included wrestlers from both heavyweight and junior heavyweight divisions including the champions.

2023

The 2023 edition's schedule was announced on January 7, 2023, and the tournament will run from March 5 until March 21.

See also
New Japan Pro-Wrestling
King of DDT Tournament
Ōdō Tournament
Wrestle-1 Grand Prix
New Japan Cup USA

Notes

References

External links
New Japan Cup at NJPW.co.jp 

New Japan Pro-Wrestling tournaments